Gobiopsis bravoi, or Bravo's bearded goby, is a species of goby found in the Western Pacific Ocean from the  Philippines, Irian Jaya, and possibly Okinawa, Ryukyu Islands and Palau.

Size

Etymology
The fish is named in honor of Pablo Bravo, Herre's illustrator for many years.

References

Gobiidae
Taxa named by Albert William Herre
Fish described in 1940
Fish of the Pacific Ocean